Cody Wilson (born July 4, 1996) is an American professional baseball outfielder in the Washington Nationals organization. He made his Major League Baseball (MLB) debut in 2021.

Career
Born in West Palm Beach, Florida, Wilson attended Jupiter Community High School, where he was a standout athlete. He attended Palm Beach State College and played junior college baseball for the Palm Beach State College Panthers from 2016-2017. In 2018, Wilson went on to Florida Atlantic University and played college baseball for the Florida Atlantic Owls. The Washington Nationals selected Wilson in the 13th round of the 2018 Major League Baseball draft.

Known for his speed, Wilson stole 22 bases in his first full professional season, playing for the Class-A Hagerstown Suns in 2019. In 2021, Wilson was invited to participate in his first spring training as a member of major league camp. Wilson was one of the minor league players brought to Nationals Park for a full-team workout the day before the Nationals' scheduled season opener, after a COVID-19 outbreak in the clubhouse led to the first four games of the season being postponed for the Nationals and landed nearly a dozen Washington players in quarantine. On April 6, Wilson was selected to the active roster. He made his major league debut the next day, pinch-hitting for pitcher Kyle McGowin against Josh Tomlin and flying out to center.

On April 9, 2021, Wilson was removed from the 40-man roster.

References

External links

FAU Owls bio

1996 births
Living people
Sportspeople from West Palm Beach, Florida
Baseball players from Florida
Major League Baseball outfielders
Washington Nationals players
Florida Atlantic Owls baseball players
Auburn Doubledays players
Gulf Coast Nationals players
Hagerstown Suns players
Wilmington Blue Rocks players
Harrisburg Senators players
Rochester Red Wings players